Sojourner: The Women's Forum was an American feminist periodical published in Cambridge, Massachusetts from 1975 until 2002. Started by a women's group from MIT, the newspaper initially aimed to provide a space for just MIT women to communicate their "ideas, their art, talents, and skills, as well as their needs as women, to the rest of the community."

As the publication expanded, so did its audience. Sojourner eventually grew to be one of the most prominent feminist news publications in the nation. It published news, articles, and reviews concerning the feminist movement. The periodical published the works of many well known contemporary feminists including Audre Lorde, Barbara Smith, Margaret Robinson, Paula Gunn Allen, Joan Nestle, and Sonia Shah. Feminist writer Jennifer Pozner began her career at Sojourner.

After publishing over 185 issues, Sojourner  gained similar prominence to contemporary popular publications such as HERESIES and Sinister Wisdom. Sojourner, like many other of its kind, struggled with finances and ultimately ceased publication due to lack of funding by 2002.

References

External links 

 Sojourner Newspaper Archive on JSTOR

Feminist magazines
Magazines established in 1975
Magazines disestablished in 2002